Presidential elections were held in Syria on 22 March 1971. There was only one candidate, Hafez al-Assad, with voters asked to approve or reject his candidacy. A reported 99% of voters voted in favour, with a turnout of 95%.

Results

References

Syria
President
Presidential elections in Syria
Single-candidate elections